Kashmala Tariq is a Pakistani politician who is the current Federal Ombudsperson for Protection against Harassment of Women at the Workplaces, in office since February 2018. Previously, she was a member of the National Assembly of Pakistan from 2002 to 2013.

Early life and education 
Tariq holds a Master of Laws from the London School of Economics and Political Science.

Tariq is a lawyer by profession. She married Waqas Khan in 2020.

Political career
Tariq was elected to the National Assembly of Pakistan as a candidate of Pakistan Muslim League (Q) (PML-Q) on a seat reserved for women from Punjab in the 2002 Pakistani general election. During her tenure as Member of the National Assembly, she remained one of the vocal woman legislators.

In 2007, she was elected as the Chairperson of the Commonwealth Women Parliamentarians Committee.

She was re-elected to the National Assembly as a candidate of PML-Q on a seat reserved for women from Punjab in the 2008 Pakistani general election.

In February 2018, Tariq was appointed as the Federal Ombudsperson for Protection against Harassment of Women at the Workplaces for a period of four years.

In March 2018, her staff beat up and held journalists from Waqt News against their will. She accused the journalists of recording an off-the-record conversation, after which she ordered her staff to forcibly take the journalist’s equipment and delete the recorded discussion.

References

Living people
Pakistani MNAs 2002–2007
Pakistani MNAs 2008–2013
Alumni of the London School of Economics
Year of birth missing (living people)
21st-century Pakistani women politicians